Sanam Saeed (born 2 February 1985) is a Pakistani actress, singer and former model who predominantly works in Urdu cinema and television. She is best known for portraying the role of Kashaf Murtaza in Momina Duraid's Zindagi Gulzar Hai for which she received numerous accolades including Lux Style Awards for Best Television Actress.

A graduate of film and theatre studies at Lahore, Saeed made her television debut in the 2010 romance Daam, Saeed had her first commercial success with the 2013 romantic series Zindagi Gulzar Hai. She rose to prominence by featuring as the female lead in several top-grossing television series, including Mata-e-Jaan Hai Tu (2013), Talkhiyaan (2013), Zindagi Gulzar Hai (2013) and Kadoorat (2013), Kahin Chand Na Sharma Jaye (2013), Ek Kasak Reh Gayi (2015), Firaaq (2014)—and received critical recognition for playing antagonist type in the 2015 family drama Diyar-e-Dil, that earned her a nomination for Best Villain at Hum Awards. Saeed was last seen playing the main protagonist in Deedan opposite Mohib Mirza.

After established herself as a leading actress in television, Saeed made her film debut with 2016 romantic comedy Bachaana and later appeared in a supporting role in Dobara Phir Se in the same year. Both of which earned her nomination for Best Actress and Best supporting Actress respectively at Lux Style Awards. Her other film appearances include biographical drama Mah-e-Mir, period drama film Rahm (both 2016), melodrama Azaad (2017) and family drama Cake (2018) for which she received nomination for Best Actress at Lux Style Awards and Pakistan Achievement Awards. In 2019, Saeed was named "Pride of Pakistan" by Daily Times.

Early life
Born in England, her father is a retired interior designer while her mother was an art teacher. She has one brother, Adnan Saeed, and one sister, Amira Saeed. The multi-ethnic family (her father is a Punjabi while her mother is a Memon) moved back to Karachi in 1990.  She did her O-levels at Bay View High School Karachi and her A-levels at L'Ecole College. Saeed started modelling at the age of 16. In Paper Magazine, she confessed that the reason she quit modelling was due to her increasingly becoming conscious about her looks for the first time in her life.

Career

Television debut   (2010–2011)
Saeed started her acting career with a supporting role in the 2010 ARY Digital serial, Daam as adaption of Umera Ahmad's novel of the same name opposite Aamina Sheikh and Sanam Baloch. Directed by Mehreen Jabbar, Saeed played the role of Fiza a "selfish and arrogant girl" who develops feeling for her sister-in-law's brother, which later become a burden for her.

The following year she played the lead female role in Adnan Ahmed's Hum TV serial Mera Naseeb, along with Syra Yousuf, Imran Aslam and Imran Abbas Naqvi. Her portrayal of Shazia, an outspoken and rebellious girl, was particularly praised.

2012–2014 
Saeed followed with the role of Yamina, a British Pakistani who is married to a materialistic snob, a wife beater (played by Junaid Khan) in Mehreen Jabbar's Mata-e-Jaan Hai Tu an adaptation of Farhat Ishtiaq's novel of the same name. Sultana Siddiqui's romantic drama Zindagi Gulzar Hai an adaption of Umera Ahmad's novel of the same name was Saeed's next serial. Co-starring Fawad Khan, she was cast as Kashaf Murtaza, a very sensible and matured girl, comes from a middle-class family background marked a departure from the glamorous characters that she had a reputation for portraying. The pairing of Saeed with Khan resulted in hype over the drama aired and it proved a major commercial success. It earned her 3 Awards as Best Actress.  In addition, Saeed played Bibi, a Syrian Christian single mother in Bee Gul's Talkhiyan, based on Arundhati Roy's novel The God of Small Things. The drama, directed by Khalid Ahmed, set in Murree, received positive feedback from the critics and Saeed's portrayal of Bibi, a Syrian Christian single mother, was particularly praised.

Saeed next played opposite Junaid Khan in the 2013 mystery drama Kadoorat aired on Hum TV from Momina Duraid. Her role was Minah, who take revenge from her step-mother and step-sister and later felt guilty. The same year, she appeared in Geo TV serial Ek Kasak Reh Gaye opposite alongside Mikaal Zulfiqar and ARY Digital's Shukk opposite Adeel Hussain and Ayesha Khan.

Saeed next appeared opposite Ahsan Khan and Sarwat Gilani in the romantic telefilm Dil Mera Dhadkan Teri, her third collaboration with Mehreen Jabbar. The telefilm was the remake of Waheed Murad's 1968 film of the same name. She featured in the role of "rich and spoiled brat". The telefilm received mixed reviews from critics, however Saeed's performance was praised by both critics and viewers. Saeed also starred in two other Eid special telefilms Kahin Chand Na Sharma Jaye opposite Goher Mumtaz and Tamana ki Tamana opposite Bilal Khan and Mathira. Saeed's only serial of 2014 was opposite Mohib Mirza, Noor Hassan Rizvi and Junaid Khan in the Hum TV serial Firaaq. She is portraying the role of Paiman who struggles to live at her own wills despite of boundaries by her mother. As for 2015, Saeed had several upcoming projects in various stages of productions. She completed Anjum Shahzad's biographical film Mah-e-Meer with Fahad Mustafa and Iman Ali, describing it as the first "glamorous" role of her career. She has also committed to feature alongside Mohib Mirza in Nasir Khan's romantic thriller Bachaana, where she will portray the role of Aalia, an Indian girl. Saeed was also finalised to play the lead in Duraid's Diyar-e-Dil.

Recent work and film debut (2015–present)

Her next serial, Diyar-e-Dil, was not only the biggest success of 2015, but also one of the most successful serials of all time in Pakistan. Directed by Haseeb Hassan, and based on Farhat Ishtiaq's novel of same name, she was cast alongside Maya Ali, Mikaal Zulfiqar, Osman Khalid Butt and Abid Ali, and portrayed Ruhina Behroze Khan, a young middle-class girl who marries her rich class fellow Behroze Khan (played by Zulfiqar), against his family members and leaves home and gives birth to new rivalry in both families.

In 2016, she was seen in four Pakistani films. She made her film debut in Nasir Khan's romantic thriller Bachaana with Mohib Mirza  She next appeared in Anjum Shahzad and Sarmad Sehbai's Mah-e-Meer, along with Fahad Mustafa and Iman Ali, describing it as the first "glamorous" role of her career. She was also seen in Ahmed Jamal's Rahm. She then appeared in Mehreen Jabbar's Dobara Phir Se, alongside Adeel Hussain, Hareem Farooq, Ali Kazmi and Tooba Siddiqui, which earned her an award for Best supporting actress (film) at the 16th Lux Style Awards.

In 2018, she appeared as the younger sister Zara, in critically acclaimed film Cake. Reviewing the film for The Express Tribune, critic Rahul Aijaz appreciates Saeed's extraordinary performance in the film and wrote ''Saeed portrays Zara with suppressed emotions, running away from her past. Hers is the journey we try to keep digging into, slowly. The actor's naturally calm exterior and controlled style of speaking aids her project Zara's insecurities.''

Music career
Saeed had briefly appeared in third season of Coke Studio Pakistan where she sang background vocals on "Alif Allah (Jugni)" by Arif Lohar and Meesha Shafi, "Aisha" by Amanat Ali and "Chori Chori" by Meesha Shafi as a backing vocalist.

Musical theater
Sanam has worked for Made for Stage Productions in the following stage plays: Chicago, Mamma Mia!, Carnage, Dhaani and Grease.

Personal life
She married her childhood friend, Farhan Hassan, who is a banker from Karachi, on 2 January 2015. In 2018, she stated that her husband and she are divorced.

Filmography

Theatre

Film

Television

Web series

Discography

Awards and nominations

Other recognitions 
2012: Loreal Paris Award (Model of the year)
 2013: Tarang House Full Awards (Best Female In Supporting Role for Dil Mera Dharkan Teri)
2017: Eastern Eye Awards 2016 (Best Film Actress award for Rahm)
2019: "Pride of Pakistan" by Daily Times

References

External links 

Pakistani television actresses
Living people
Pakistani female models
Actresses from London
Pakistani women singers
Actresses from Karachi
Singers from Karachi
Pakistani film actresses
21st-century Pakistani actresses
Hum Award winners
Punjabi people
Memon people
1985 births
21st-century English women
21st-century English people